Doddridge may refer to:

John Doddridge (1555-1628), English lawyer and MP
Philip Doddridge (1702-1751), English Nonconformist
Philip Doddridge (1773–1832), U.S. Representative from Virginia
Doddridge, Arkansas, United States
Doddridge County, West Virginia, United States